Girl with Green Eyes is a 1964 British film adapted by Edna O'Brien from her novel The Lonely Girl. It tells the story of a young, naive country girl's romance with a sophisticated older man. Directed by Desmond Davis, the film stars Peter Finch, Rita Tushingham, Lynn Redgrave and Julian Glover. As the film is in black and white the green eyes are never seen.

The film studies the blossoming relationship between a young girl and a man twice her age, but with her controlling much of the relationship.

Plot
Kate Brady, a young girl just out of convent school, moves from her family home in the rural Irish countryside to Dublin, where she works in a grocery shop and rooms with her friend and schoolmate, Baba Brennan. The girls go dancing at clubs and date young men they meet, but the down-to-earth Baba is more socially adept than shy, romantic Kate. On a ride to the countryside with one of Baba's boyfriends, the girls meet Eugene Gaillard, a sophisticated middle-aged author.

Kate is attracted to him, and when she happens to see him again in a Dublin bookshop, uncharacteristically approaches him and strikes up a conversation. A friendship, and later a romantic relationship, develops between Kate and Eugene despite their age difference. Although clearly in love, and happy to join him in bed, she is unable to have sex. The repeated inability to have sex with Eugene starts to take its toll. The relationship worsens on her discovery that he is married with a child, although separated from his wife who has gone to the United States to obtain a divorce.

When Kate's father learns that his daughter is seeing a married man and thus apparently committing adultery, he and his friends go to Dublin and force Kate to return to his rural home. She sneaks out on the first morning but is waylaid by a cowhand. Later when the priest begins to lecture her she runs off. She returns to Eugene. Kate's father and his friends appear unexpectedly and punch Eugene in the face, but are driven off by his no-nonsense housekeeper Josie, who fires a shotgun at the ceiling and threatens them with the second barrel, forcing them to leave. Kate and Eugene then finally succeed in consummating their relationship.

He buys her a ring and Kate treats it as a wedding ring. She starts wearing make-up and wearing her hair up, looking much more sophisticated. She tells a stranger "I got married today". They live together for a time.

Eventually, Kate becomes unhappy as Eugene does not share her Catholic beliefs, his friends do not regard Kate seriously, and he continues to correspond with his estranged wife, for whom he still has some feelings. When Eugene's wife sends a plane ticket Kate gives him an ultimatum to choose but he does not react as she wishes and it is the beginning of the end.

Kate leaves Eugene and returns to Baba, who is packing to move to London. She invites Kate to come along with her. Kate hopes that Eugene will come after her and she looks expectantly at the people on the dock edge as they sail off. He does not appear. Instead he sends word through Baba that their break-up is probably for the best. He wishes he had been younger or she had been more mature. Kate narrates explaining that she has changed and that she goes to night school. She meets "different people, different men".

Cast

 Rita Tushingham as Kate Brady  
 Lynn Redgrave as Baba Brennan  
 Peter Finch as Eugene Gaillard  
 Marie Kean as Josie Hannigan
 Arthur O'Sullivan as James Brady  
 Julian Glover as Malachi Sullivan  
 T. P. McKenna as Father Brown the priest  
 Lislott Goettinger as Joanna
 Pat Laffan as Bertie Counihan
 Eileen Crowe as Mrs. Byrne
 May Craig as Aunt
 Joe Lynch as Andy Devlin  
 Yolande Turner as Mary Maguire  
 Harry Brogan as Jack Holland  
 Michael Hennessey as Davey
 Joe O'Donnell as Patrick Devlin
 Micheal O'Briain as Lodger
 David Kelly as Ticket Collector

Critical reception
In The New York Times, Bosley Crowther wrote "Girl with Green Eyes is another of those remarkably fresh and natural films that have come from the Woodfall organisation, which is sparked by protean Tony Richardson and which has given us such a dazzling range of pictures as A Taste of Honey, Loneliness of the Long Distance Runner and Tom Jones. While it is not as ambitious or extensive as any of those, it is a wonderfully tender, touching and humorous little drama of a lonely Irish girl." Similarly, Variety wrote that the film "has the smell of success," and that director "Davis is imaginative, prepared to take chances and has the sympathy to draw perceptive performances from his cast."

References

External links
 

1964 films
1964 drama films
British black-and-white films
British romantic drama films
Films about writers
Films based on Irish novels
Films scored by John Addison
Films set in Dublin (city)
Films directed by Desmond Davis
United Artists films
Works by Edna O'Brien
1964 directorial debut films
1960s English-language films
1960s British films